Sympistis amun is a moth of the family Noctuidae first described by James T. Troubridge in 2008.

Its habitat are dry mountainous forests.

Adults are on wing from June to August.

References

amun
Moths of North America
Fauna of California
Moths described in 2008